Josefa Fabíola Almeida de Souza Alves (born 3 February 1983 in Brasília) is a Brazilian professional volleyball player who won the bronze medal at the 2014 World Championship playing with the Brazil national team.

Career
De Souza  claimed the silver medal in the 2014 FIVB Club World Championship, playing with Molico Osasco, when her team lost 0-3 to the Russian Dinamo Kazan the championship match. She was named among the championship Best Team as Best Setter.

De Souza played with her national team, winning the bronze at the 2014 World Championship when her team defeated Italy 3-2 in the bronze medal match.

After signing with the Russian club Dinamo Krasnodar for the 2014/2015 she won the 2015 FIVB Club World Championship silver medal when her team lost to the Turkish Eczacibasi VitrA in the championship match. She was recognized with the Best Setter individual award.

Clubs
  Paraná Vôlei Clube (2000–2001)
  Minas Tênis Clube (2001–2004)
  São Caetano (2004–2005)
  A.D. Brusque (2007–2009)
  Esporte Clube Pinheiros (2009–2011)
  Sollys Osasco (2011–2014)
  Dinamo Krasnodar (2014–2015)
  Volero Zurich (2015–2017)
  Nestle Osasco (2017–2018)
  SESI Vôlei Bauru (2018–2019)
  Sesc Rio (2019–)

Awards

Individual
 2011–12 Brazilian Superliga – "Best Setter" 
 2012 South American Club Championship – "Best Setter"
 2012–13 Brazilian Superliga – "Best Setter" 
 2014 Russian Cup – "Most Valuable Player"
 2014 Russian Cup – "Best Setter"
 2014 FIVB Club World Championship – "Best Setter"
 2015 FIVB Club World Championship – "Best Setter"

Clubs
 2012 FIVB Club World Championship –  Champion, with Sollys Nestlé Osasco
 2014 FIVB Club World Championship –  Runner-up, with Molico Osasco
 2015 FIVB Club World Championship –  Runner-up, with Dinamo Krasnodar

References

1983 births
Living people
Brazilian women's volleyball players
Volleyball players at the 2011 Pan American Games
Pan American Games gold medalists for Brazil
Brazilian expatriates in Russia
Brazilian expatriate sportspeople in Switzerland
Pan American Games medalists in volleyball
Volleyball players at the 2016 Summer Olympics
Olympic volleyball players of Brazil
Setters (volleyball)
Expatriate volleyball players in Russia
Expatriate volleyball players in Switzerland
Medalists at the 2011 Pan American Games
Sportspeople from Brasília